Blood Hostages is a fantasy novel by J. Robert King, set in the Planescape campaign setting, and based on the Dungeons & Dragons role-playing game. It is the first novel published in the "Blood Wars Trilogy". It was published in paperback, January 1996.

Plot summary
In Blood Hostages, a kidnap reveals an uncle's dark past; his teenage rescuers endure a process of self- discovery that reveals royal parentage; a mysterious mentor assembles a company of rogues to aid them; the kids have one of the most powerful magic items in the world; and a demon-god aims to use it to rule the universe.

Reception
Trenton Webb reviewed Blood Hostages for Arcane magazine, rating it a 5 out of 10 overall. He commented that "This book may be formulaic fantasy but it's fun. Perverse enjoyment comes from the ceaseless parade of fantasy fiction conventions, while genuine pleasure comes from the headlong charge through the bizarre Planescape multiverse." Webb commented that the novel "shamelessly employs every fantasy cliché", but concluded his review by saying "Despite this, it's a tolerable read. The flat characters are rescued by the energy, variety and weirdness of the planes. No attempt is made to explain how each world works: the characters only see how that plane affects their skills, echoing the style of the Planescape manuals. Experienced Planescape players will warm to Blood Hostages as their game world is brought, somewhat functionally, to life. It's a useful source of planar descriptions, an example of how they can be played and an excellent introduction for those who wish to explore them. Just don't turn to it for plot inspiration."

References

1996 novels
Novels based on Dungeons & Dragons
Novels by J. Robert King
Planescape